Muzzle velocity is the speed of a projectile (bullet, pellet, slug, ball/shots or shell) with respect to the muzzle at the moment it leaves the end of a gun's barrel (i.e. the muzzle).

Projectile velocity
For projectiles in unpowered flight, its velocity is highest at leaving the muzzle and drops off steadily because of air resistance. Projectile speed through air depends on a number of factors such as barometric pressure, humidity, air temperature and wind speed. Some high-velocity small arms have muzzle velocities higher than the escape velocities of some Solar System bodies such as Pluto and Ceres, meaning that a bullet fired from such a gun on the surface of the body would leave its gravitational field; however no arms are known with muzzle velocities that can overcome Earth's gravity (and atmosphere) or those of the other planets or the Moon.

While traditional cartridges cannot generally achieve a Lunar escape velocity (approximately ) or higher due to modern limitations of action and propellant, a  projectile was accelerated to velocities exceeding  at Sandia National Laboratories in 1994.  The gun operated in two stages.  First, burning gunpowder was used to drive a piston to pressurize hydrogen to 10,000 atm.  The pressurized gas was then released to a secondary piston, which traveled forward into a shock-absorbing "pillow", transferring the energy from the piston to the projectile on the other side of the pillow.

This discovery might indicate that future projectile velocities exceeding  have to have a charging, gas-operated action that transfers the energy, rather than a system that uses primer, gunpowder, and a fraction of the released gas. A .22 LR cartridge is approximately three times the mass of the projectile in question.  This may be another indication that future arms developments will take more interest in smaller caliber rounds, especially due to modern limitations such as metal usage, cost, and cartridge design.  In a side by side comparison with the .50 BMG (43g), the  titanium round of any caliber released almost 28 times the energy of the .50 BMG (1g at 10 000m/s = 50 000 joules), with only a 27% mean loss in momentum.  Energy, in most cases, is what is lethal to the target, not momentum.

Conventional guns
In conventional guns, muzzle velocity is determined by the quantity of the propellant, its quality (in terms of chemical burn speed and expansion), the mass of the projectile, and the length of the barrel. A slower-burning propellant needs a longer barrel to finish its burn before leaving, but conversely can use a heavier projectile. This is a mathematical tradeoff. A faster-burning propellant may accelerate a lighter projectile to higher speeds if the same amount of propellant is used. Within a gun, the gaseous pressure created as a result of the combustion process is a limiting factor on projectile velocity. Consequently, propellant quality and quantity, projectile mass, and barrel length must all be balanced to achieve safety and to optimize performance.

Longer barrels give the propellant force more time to work on propelling the bullet.  For this reason longer barrels generally provide higher velocities, everything else being equal.  As the bullet moves down the bore, however, the propellant's gas pressure behind it diminishes. Given a long enough barrel, there would eventually be a point at which friction between the bullet and the barrel, and air resistance, would equal the force of the gas pressure behind it, and from that point, the velocity of the bullet would decrease.

Rifles
Rifled barrels have spiral twists carved inside them that spin the bullet so that it remains stable in flight, in the same way an American football thrown in a spiral will fly in a straight, stable manner. This mechanism is known as rifling. Longer barrels provide more opportunity to rotate the bullet before it leaves the gun. Longer barrels increase the overall precision of the weapon. If one examines shot groups on a paper target from a  barrel, a  barrel, and a  barrel, one will observe how the longer barrels produce "tighter" grouping, with bullets landing closer together on the target.

A bullet, while moving through its barrel, is being pushed forward by the gas expanding behind it. This gas was created following the trigger being pulled, causing the firing pin to strike the primer, which in turn ignited the solid propellant packed inside the bullet cartridge, making it combust while situated in the chamber. Once it leaves the barrel, the force of the expanding gas ceases to propel the bullet forth. When a bullet is fired from a handgun with a  barrel, the bullet only has a  "runway" to be spun before it leaves the barrel. Likewise, it has only a  space in which to accelerate before it must fly without any additional force behind it. In some instances, the powder may not have even been fully burned in guns with short barrels. So, the muzzle velocity of a  barrel is less than that of a  barrel, which is less than that of a  barrel.

Large naval guns will have high length-to-diameter ratios, ranging between 38:1 to 50:1. This length ratio maximizes the projectile velocity.  There is much interest in modernizing naval weaponry by using electrically powered railguns, which shoot projectiles using an electromagnetic pulse. These overcome the limitations noted above. With these railguns, a constant acceleration is provided along the entire length of the device by means of the electromagnetic pulse. This greatly increases the muzzle velocity. Another significant advantage of railguns is not requiring explosive propellant. The result of this is that a ship will not need to transport propellant and that a land-station will not have to maintain an inventory of it either. Explosive propellant, stored in large quantities, is susceptible to explosion. While this can be mitigated with safety precautions, railguns eschew the need for such measures altogether. Even the projectile internal charges may be eliminated due to the already high velocity. This means the projectile becomes a strictly kinetic weapon.

Categories of velocity
The United States Army defines different categories of muzzle velocity for different classes of weapons:

See also
Firearm
Gun chronograph
Internal ballistics
Muzzle energy

References

Ammunition
Ballistics